Dihydrolipoic acid is an organic compound that is the reduced form of lipoic acid. This carboxylic acid features a pair of thiol groups, and therefore is a dithiol.  It is optically active, but only the R-enantiomer is biochemically significant.  The lipoic acid/dihydrolipoic acid pair participate in a variety of biochemical transformations.

See also
 Dihydrolipoamide
 Lipoamide

References

Carboxylic acids
Thiols